Nonadecane is an alkane hydrocarbon with the chemical formula CH3(CH2)17CH3, simplified to C19H40.

References

External links 
 Material Safety Data Sheet for Nonadecane
 Activities of a Specific Chemical Query

Alkanes